Mouni Abderrahim (born November 19, 1985, in Béjaïa) is an Algerian volleyball player. She has been part of Algeria's Olympic volleyball team twice, in 2008 and 2012.

Club information
Debut club :   ASW Bejaia
Current club :  MB Bejaia

References

1985 births
Living people
Algerian women's volleyball players
Volleyball players at the 2008 Summer Olympics
Volleyball players at the 2012 Summer Olympics
Olympic volleyball players of Algeria
Competitors at the 2009 Mediterranean Games
Volleyball players from Béjaïa
Mediterranean Games competitors for Algeria
21st-century Algerian women
20th-century Algerian women